Sunshine Molly is an extant 1915 American silent film directed by Phillips Smalley and Lois Weber and written by Lois Weber. The film stars Lois Weber, Phillips Smalley, Adele Farrington, Margaret Edwards, Herbert Standing and Vera Lewis. The film was released on March 18, 1915, by Paramount Pictures.  Surviving reels were released on DVD and Blu-ray in 2018.

Plot

Cast  
Lois Weber as Sunshine Molly
Phillips Smalley as 'Bull' Forrest
Adele Farrington as Widow Budd
Margaret Edwards as Mirra Budd
Herbert Standing as Pat O'Brien
Vera Lewis as Mrs. O'Brien
Roberta Hickman as Patricia O'Brien
Frank Elliott as Patricia's Fiancé
Charles Marriott as Old Pete

Preservation status
A print is preserved in the Library of Congress collection Packard Campus.

References

External links 
 

1915 films
1910s English-language films
Silent American comedy films
1915 comedy films
Paramount Pictures films
Films directed by Lois Weber
American black-and-white films
American silent feature films
1910s American films